Sidinox  was a 52-foot waterline length proa that was sailed across the Atlantic ocean in 1981.

See also
 List of multihulls

References

1981 in sailing
Individual sailing vessels
Multihulls